Mookencheril Cherian Joseph, popularly known as Yukthivadi M. C. Joseph (യുക്തിവാദി എം സി ജോസഫ്‌), was an eminent rationalist from Kerala, India. He was one of the very significant figures of Kerala Renaissance too.

Joseph was born on 6 January 1887 at Thripunithura in Kerala. His father was Mookencheril Kuncheria and mother Maria. After his education, he took up his career as a lawyer. He was one of the founders of Yukthivadi (meaning the Rationalist in English), the first ever rationalist / atheist magazine in Malayalam along with Ramavarma Thampan, C. Krishnan, C. V. Kunhiraman and Sahodaran Ayyappan. The first issue of the Yukthivadi was brought out in August, 1929. Sahodaran Ayyappan was the first editor of the magazine. Two years later M. C. Joseph took over the editorship and successfully continued its publication without a single gap in the issues for the next 45 years, single-handedly. His famous column Kurippukal (Notes) carried scathing criticism of all organized religions, superstitions, and undemocratic and authoritarian political systems. During his tenure as its editor, the magazine got so identified with its editor that he came to be known as Yukthivadi M. C. Joseph, meaning M C Joseph the rationalist. In July 1974, at the age of 87, he handed over the magazine job to Unni Kakkanand, a few months before he breathed his last on 26 October 1981.

Joseph died on 26 October 1981 at the age of 94. As per his wishes, the body was handed over to Calicut Medical College.

Bharathiya yukthivadi Sangham, a rationalist organisation founded by Sreeni Pattathanam is giving the M. C. Joseph Award in memory of him to distinguished secular writers and activists in Malayalam. Kureepuzha Sreekumar, Pavanan, Malayalam writer Zacharia, Thilakan, Vaisakhan, M K Sanu, Anand etc. are the winners of this award. Then Chief Minister of Kerala, Pinarayi Vijayan had handed over the M C Joseph award to M K Sanu on 20 August 2017. During his speech at the event Pinarayi Vijayan said M C Joseph had the capability to provide logical answers and establish his point of view on questions related to rationalism.  “He was one of those who fearlessly fought superstitions and ill- practices of his time. Such bravado energises posterity also," the Chief Minister opined.

Yukthivadi Journal 
This had been a significant publication with an intellectual appeal on people of Kerala due mainly to the persons by whom it was started and had been published for over four decades — the legendary Sahodaran Ayyappan and the merciless social critic M. C. Joseph. It was no less than an intellectual stimulant of the time for the people of Kerala.

Books

Purogathi (Progress) (1947)
Yukthiprakasham (Light of Reason) (1966)
Prabhodhanam (1966)
Ashayasamaram (1976)
Thiranjetutha Kurippukal (Selected Notes)(1976)
Chinthaviplavam (1976)
Nasthikya Chintha (Atheist Thoughts)(1977)
Swatanthra Chintha (Free Thought)(1978)
Kuttichathan (Goblins)(1983)
Emciyute Lekhanangal (Essays)(1991)
Emciyute Darshanangal (1995)
Jotsyam Oru Kapada Sasthram (2004) Indian Atheist Publishers
Punarjanma Smaranakal (2004) Indian Atheist Publishers
Kalathinu Mumpe Nadannavar (2005) Indian Atheist Publisher

List of recipients of Yukthivadi MC Joseph Award
Yukthivadi M C Joseph Award was constituted by the rationalist organisation Bharatheeya Yukthivadi Sangham, founded by Sreeni Pattathanam. The  award is given to persons who stood for rational and secularist causes.

References

 M.C. Enna Manushyan : J. Edamaruku (1959) by Jai Hind Publishers, Kottayam; Revised edition (2004) by Indian Atheist Publishers.
 Yukthivadi M.C. Joseph : M. K. Sanu (May 2002) (Department of Cultural Publications, Government of Kerala, Thiruvananthapuram -14)

Indian sceptics
Indian materialists
Indian atheists
1887 births
1981 deaths
20th-century Indian journalists
Malayalam-language journalists
Journalists from Kerala
Writers from Kochi
Indian male writers
20th-century Indian essayists